Palizada is  a city in the Mexican state of Campeche. 
It is situated in the south-west the state.
It serves as the municipal seat for the surrounding municipality of the same name. As of 2010, the Palizada had a population of 3,089.

Palizada is on the Palizada River, a distributary of the Usumacinta which empties into Laguna de Términos.

Palizada was named a "Pueblo Mágico" in 2010.

References

Palizada Enciclopedia de los Municipios de México (INAFED)
Ayuntamiento de Palizada Municipal website 

Populated places in Campeche
Pueblos Mágicos
Municipality seats in Campeche